Speedy is a nickname which may refer to:

 Speedy Atkins (1875–1928), American worker whose corpse was turned into a mummy
 Speedy Claxton (born 1978), American basketball coach and former player
 Speedy Duncan (1942–2021), American football player
 Speedy Haworth (1922–2008), American guitarist and singer
 Gregory S. Martin (born 1948), United States Air Force general
 Speedy Morris (born 1942), American basketball coach
 Jeret Peterson (1981–2011), American aerial skier
 Speedy Smith (born 1993), American basketball player for Hapoel Jerusalem of the Israeli Basketball Premier League
 Speedy Thomas (1947–2003), American football wide receiver
 Speedy Thompson (1926–1972), American racing driver
 Speedy West (1924–2003), American guitarist

See also
 Bob Feller (1918–2010), American baseball pitcher nicknamed "Rapid Robert"
 Nick Van Exel (born 1971), American basketball coach and former player nicknamed "Nick the Quick"

Lists of people by nickname